Petersfield is a market town and civil parish in the East Hampshire district of Hampshire, England.

Petersfield may also refer to:

Places
 Petersfield, Cambridgeshire, England
 Petersfield, Jamaica, a small town in the parish of Westmoreland
 Petersfield, Manitoba, an unincorporated community in Canada

Other uses
 Petersfield (UK Parliament constituency), a former constituency in Petersfield, Hampshire
 Petersfield railway station, a railway station in Petersfield, Hampshire
 The Petersfield School, a comprehensive school in Petersfield, Hampshire
 Petersfield Town F.C., a football club in Petersfield, Hampshire
 Petersfield R.F.C., a rugby union club based in Petersfield, Hampshire
 HMS Petersfield

See also
Peterfield, an historic home in Allendale, New Jersey, U.S.